"Come Over" is a song by English drum and bass band Rudimental, featuring vocals from Anne-Marie and Tion Wayne. The song was released as a digital download on 28 August 2020. The song peaked at number twenty-six on the UK Singles Chart. The song was written by Amir Amor, Anne-Marie Nicholson, Dennis Junior Odunwo, Leon Rolle, Olivia Devine, Piers Aggett and Kesi Dryden.

Music video
A music video to accompany the release of "Come Over" was first released onto YouTube on 28 August 2020.

Personnel
Credits adapted from Tidal.
 Rudimental – producer
 Amir Amor – composer
 Anne-Marie Nicholson – composer, featured artist
 Dennis Junior Odunwo – composer, featured artist 
 Leon Rolle – composer
 Olivia Devine – composer
 Piers Aggett – composer
 Kesi Dryden – composer

Charts

Certifications

Release history

References

2020 singles
2020 songs
Rudimental songs
Anne-Marie (singer) songs
Asylum Records singles
Song recordings produced by Rudimental
Songs written by Amir Amor
Songs written by Anne-Marie (singer)
Songs written by Tion Wayne
Tion Wayne songs